The 1913–14 Scottish Cup was the 41st staging of Scotland's most prestigious football knockout competition. The Cup was won by Celtic who defeated Hibernian in the replayed final.

Fourth round

Semi-finals

Final

Replay

Teams

See also
1913–14 in Scottish football

References

1913–14
1913–14 domestic association football cups
Cup